Bilik may refer to:

A room in a longhouse, Borneo
Surname
Jerry Bilik
Jen Bilik
Andy Bilik